Sam Querrey defeated Rafael Nadal in the final, 6–3, 7–6(7–3) to win the men's singles tennis title at the 2017 Mexican Open.

Dominic Thiem was the defending champion but lost in the quarterfinals to Querrey.

Seeds

Draw

Finals

Top half

Bottom half

Qualifying

Seeds

Qualifiers

Lucky loser
  Jordan Thompson

Qualifying draw

First qualifier

Second qualifier

Third qualifier

Fourth qualifier

References
Main draw
Qualifying draw

2017 Abierto Mexicano Telcel